Dobri dol or Dobri Dol may refer to the following villages:

In Bulgaria
 Dobri dol, Kyustendil Province - a village in Treklyano municipality, Kyustendil Province
 Dobri dol, Montana Province - a village in Lom municipality, Montana Province
 Dobri dol, Plovdiv Province - a village in Parvomay municipality, Plovdiv Province
 Dobri Dol, Varna Province - a village in Avren municipality, Varna Province

In Croatia
 Dobri dol, Zagreb, a neighbourhood in Maksimir, Zagreb

In the Republic of Macedonia
 Dobri Dol, Sopište Municipality - a village in Sopište Municipality
 Dobri Dol, Vrapčište - a village in Vrapčište Municipality

See also
Dobri Do (disambiguation)
Dobrodol (disambiguation)